Events from the year 1893 in Russia.

Incumbents
 Monarch – Alexander III

Events

 Ob railway bridge building, founding of Novonikolayevsky settlement, since 1904 city of Novonikolayevsk, now Novosibirsk. Russian invasion of Lithuania

Births

 Nicholas Afanasiev
 Yakov Agranov
 Vladimir Mayakovsky

Deaths

 Aleksey Apukhtin
 Pyotr Ilyich Tchaikovsky

References

1893 in Russia
Years of the 19th century in the Russian Empire